Jim Knaub (b. ca 1956) is a former professional wheelchair marathon athlete.

Sport
He was a pole vault competitor at Long Beach State and a semifinalist for the 1976 Olympics before a 1978 traffic accident left him paralyzed. He went through rehabilitation at Rancho Los Amigos National Rehabilitation Center, but did not regain the use of his legs. After setting a wheelchair marathon world record at the 1982 Boston Marathon, he went on to win four more times for a total of four world records, and, along with female champion Candace Cable, "gave the 'wheelies' a personality in the 1980s and early 1990s".  In the 1990s he held "the world record in every race distance from 5,000 meters to the marathon."

Business
Knaub joined Cannondale Bicycle Corporation in 1998 as production manager for the company's competition wheelchairs.

Biographical movie
A movie about Knaub's life, titled Hell on Wheels is reported to be in development by Walt Disney Pictures.

Actor
Jim Knaub has appeared as an actor in television (The A Team, The Love Boat and others) and movies.

Accolades
Lakewood, California Youth Hall of Fame, 1981
Long Beach State Hall of Fame, 1990

See also
List of winners of the Boston Marathon#Men's Wheelchair
Los Angeles Marathon#Top finishers

References

External links

Boston Marathon winners
Long Beach State Beach men's track and field athletes
1956 births
Living people
People from Lakewood, California
People with paraplegia